Bartolo Ambrosione (born 22 May 1959) is an Italian equestrian. He competed at the 1984 Summer Olympics and the 1988 Summer Olympics.

References

External links
 

1959 births
Living people
Italian male equestrians
Olympic equestrians of Italy
Equestrians at the 1984 Summer Olympics
Equestrians at the 1988 Summer Olympics
Sportspeople from Brescia